Banxing or BX-1, is a small Chinese technology development satellite which was deployed from the Shenzhou 7 spacecraft at 11:27 GMT on 27 September 2008. Prior to deployment, the satellite was mounted on top of the Shenzhou 7 orbital module.

Purpose
Banxing was used to relay images of the Shenzhou 7 spacecraft. Weighing some 40 kilograms, and containing two cameras and communication equipment, it was maneuvered using an ammonia gas-based propulsion system.  Following the re-entry of Shenzhou 7, Banxing remained in orbit as part of a formation-flying experiment with the discarded Shenzhou orbital module.

A few hours after Banxing was launched it and the Shenzhou 7 orbital module passed unusually close to the International Space Station. This provoked some speculation that the experiment was intended to test military anti-satellite interception technology.

See also 

 2008 in spaceflight
 Orbital Express

References 

Satellites of China
Shenzhou 7
Shenzhou program
Spacecraft launched in 2008
Spacecraft which reentered in 2009
2008 in spaceflight